Aisha Jalil is a Pakistani former cricketer who played as an all-rounder. She appeared in three One Day Internationals for Pakistan in 1997, all on the side's tour of Australia and New Zealand. She made her WODI debut against New Zealand on 28 January 1997. 

Following her career, Aisha Jalil worked in sport development, and then as an Assistant Manager of Women's Cricket at the PCB. In 2018, she was named as one of the 30 most influential Muslim women in sport, for her work in youth development.

References

External links
 
 

Date of birth missing (living people)
Year of birth missing (living people)
Living people
Pakistani women cricketers
Pakistan women One Day International cricketers
Place of birth missing (living people)